

Buildings and structures

Buildings

 about 800 – Borobudur temple in Java completed.
 802
 Haeinsa of Korea, is constructed.
 Palace of Charlemagne in Aachen, Carolingian Empire completed (begun about 790). The Palatine Chapel still stands.
 At Oviedo in the Kingdom of Asturias
 Cámara Santa constructed.
 First reconstruction of Oviedo Cathedral begun by Tioda.
 815 – Second Temple of Somnath built in the Pratihara Empire, India.
 816 – Reims Cathedral begun.
 810s – Chapel of San Zeno in Santa Prassede, Rome decorated.
 818 – Old Cologne Cathedral built.
 820s
 Imperial Abbey of Corvey on the Weser founded.
 Fontanella Abbey reconstructed.
 827 – Mosque of Amr ibn al-As in Fustat, Egypt reaches its final form.
 c. 830–842 – Construction of basilica church of San Julián de los Prados in Oviedo, Kingdom of Asturias, designed by Tioda.
 836
 Samarra founded in Mesopotamia as the capital of the Abbasid Caliphate.
 Great Mosque of Kairouan founded in Aghlabid Tunisia.
 838 – Jawsaq Khakani Palace built in Samarra.
 840s – Santa María del Naranco Hall, San Miguel de Lillo constructed.
 840 – The main pagoda of the Three Pagodas in Dali, Yunnan, China is built.
 c. 842 – San Miguel de Lillo in Oviedo, Kingdom of Asturias is built.
 847 – St. Peter's Basilica and Basilica of Saint Paul Outside the Walls in Rome partly rebuilt.

 848
 First enlargement of the Great Mosque of Cordoba, in the Emirate of Cordoba finished (begun in 832).
 Santa María del Naranco built in Oviedo as part of a palace complex of Ramiro I King of Asturias
 c. 850 – Prambanan Temple built in Java.
 851 – Great Mosque of Sousse built in Aghlabid Tunisia.
 852
 Great Mosque of Samarra and Malwiya Minaret completed (begun in 848).
 Hildesheim Cathedral begun.
 c. 854 – Balkuwara Palace of Caliph Al-Mutawakkil built in Samarra.
 855 – Construction of the second Würzburg Cathedral (building no longer existing).
 858 – Invading Vikings set fire to the earliest church on the site of Chartres Cathedral, necessitating its reconstruction.
 859 – Halberstadt Cathedral constructed.
 861 – Abu Dolaf Mosque built in Samarra (begun in 859).
 862 – Reims Cathedral constructed.
 864 – Cathedral of Santa Maria Assunta on Torcello partly rebuilt.
 869 – City walls of Dijon, Le Mans and Tours reconstructed.
 c. 870 – Church of St. Apostles Peter and Paul in Serbia is reconstructed.
 873 – Imperial Abbey of Corvey begun; church westwork completed c. 885.
 875 – Great Mosque of Kairouan in Aghlabid Tunisia reaches its current aspect.
 c. 875 – The Great Basilica of Pliska, capital of the First Bulgarian Empire is finished.
 879
 Mosque of Ibn Tulun, Fustat, Tulunid Egypt finished (begun in 876; consecrated 884).
 Preah Ko, first temple built in the Khmer Empire capital of Hariharalaya.

 880
 The oldest Islamic contraction in Iran, the Tarikhaneh Temple (mosque) in Damghan, is built.
 Nea Ekklesia church in Constantinople consecrated.
 881 – Bakong, first temple mountain built in Hariharalaya.
 c. 883–902 – Shankaragaurishvara Temple in Kashmir built.
 After 887 – St Mark's Campanile in Venice begun as a watch tower.
 893 – Lolei temple in Hariharalaya built.
 897 – Reconstruction of Nantes Cathedral begun.
 9th century
 Basilica of Sant'Ambrogio in Milan – the right bell-tower; known as "dei Monaci" ("bell tower of the monks"), is constructed.
 Derawar Fort in Bahawalpur, Punjab built.
 Banyunibo Buddhist temple in Java is constructed.
 Church of Holy Trinity, Split in Split, Croatia.
 Church of the Holy Cross, Nin in Nin, Croatia.
 Fortified Church of the Saintes Maries de la Mer in Provence.
 Late 9th century – La Foncalada fountain in Oviedo, Asturias constructed.

Deaths
 814 – Odo of Metz, Carolingian architect (born 742)

See also
8th century in architecture
10th century in architecture
Timeline of architecture

References

Architecture